is a Japanese actress.

Filmography

Films
 Shall We Dance? (1996)
 Itsuka dokusho suruhi (2005)
 Call Boy (2018)
 Inori (2021)
 Akira and Akira (2022)

Television
 Hakusen Nagashi (1996), Fuyumi Tachibana
 Hakusen Nagashi: Spring at Age 19 (1997), Fuyumi Tachibana
 Great Teacher Onizuka (1998), Yoshiko Uchiyamada
 Hakusen Nagashi: The Wind at Age 20 (1999), Fuyumi Tachibana
 Hakusen Nagashi: The Poem of Travels (2001), Fuyumi Tachibana
 Hakusen Nagashi: Age 25 (2003), Fuyumi Tachibana
 Hakusen Nagashi: The Final: Even as the Times of Dreaming have Passed (2005), Fuyumi Tachibana
 School Counselor (2017)

References

External links

JMDb Profile (in Japanese)
Profile at Horipro Square (in Japanese)

1979 births
Living people
Japanese actresses
Actors from Kagawa Prefecture
People from Mitoyo, Kagawa